Rai Movie is an Italian movie television channel, owned by state-owned television network Rai and broadcast on digital terrestrial television in Italy and on satellite platform Tivù Sat.

The channel was launched in 2003 as RaiSat Cinema World and re-badged in 2006 as RaiSat Cinema. On 30 June 2009, RaiSat Cinema was removed of Sky and was launched in the new free-to-view satellite platform Tivùsat. On 18 May 2010 it was renamed Rai Movie. It broadcasts mostly Italian films, interviews, backstages and documentaries.

Since 2003 it is the official media partner of the Venice Film Festival and since 2007 of the Rome Film Festival.

In April 2019, Rai announced that this channel, along with Rai Premium, will shut down to make place for a new channel called Rai 6, with a female target. This sparked controversy and an online petition that quickly reached 120.000 signatures. However, the scheduled date for the shutdown is unknown to this day.

Logos

References

Movie
Television channels and stations established in 2006
Italian-language television stations
Movie channels in Italy